The 1988 Virginia Slims of New Orleans was a tennis tournament played on outdoor hard courts in New Orleans, Louisiana in the United States and was part of Tier III of the 1988 WTA Tour. It was the fifth, and last, edition of the tournament and ran from October 3 through October 9, 1988. First-seeded Chris Evert won the singles title, her third at the event after 1985 and 1987, and earned $50,000 first-prize money.

Finals

Singles

 Chris Evert defeated  Anne Smith 6–4, 6–1
 It was Evert's 4th singles title of the year and the 157nd, and last, of her career.

Doubles

 Beth Herr /  Candy Reynolds defeated  Lori McNeil /  Betsy Nagelsen 6–4, 6–4
 It was Herr's 2nd title of the year and the 6th of her career. It was Reynolds' 2nd title of the year and the 26th of her career.

References

External links
 ITF tournament edition details

1988 WTA Tour
1988
1988 in sports in Louisiana
1988 in American tennis